Men.com is a producer of Gay internet pornography content. It is owned by MindGeek.

The domain name was purchased in December 2003 from entrepreneur Rick Schwartz for $1.3 million. Many porn stars have made scenes for the production company, among them are Bobby Clark, Landon Conrad, Malik Delgaty, Rocco Reed, Luke Adams, William Seed, and Paddy O'Brian.

History
Beginning in October 2015 with the "Stealth Fuckers" series, Men.com began to introduce female characters into non-sexual roles, creating controversy over whether female performers belonged in gay porn. In January 2018, Men.com released a controversial scene featuring heterosexual sex and created a category for "bisexual porn". 

In August 2018, Men.com released its first scene featuring MMF bisexual porn titled "The Challenge", creating further controversy over whether bisexual porn belongs on a gay porn website. Men.com stated that they decided to feature bisexual content because "After asking our users what they would like to see, a surprisingly large number asked for a fully bisexual scene." Arad Winwin, the star of the scene and a self-identified gay man, faced backlash from fans for acting in the scene, with some fans accusing him of being straight or of having "converted" to heterosexual or bisexual. Winwin told the gay website Str8UpGayPorn that "I'm a gay man...This was only a job, and it was nothing more. Nothing personal. I was working, and it was like any other scene I've done". 

In February 2019, Men.com released "He's Always Hard For Me", its first scene featuring a transgender man. The scene features transgender porn actor Luke Hudson and gay porn actor Dante Colle. In April, a second scene featuring a trans man was released. Some gay men have complained about the presence of transgender men on the website, leading the gay porn reporter Zachary Sires to respond by defending Men.com's decision, arguing that it was a smart business decision that could broaden Men.com's audience and that could lead some viewers to be more tolerant of transgender men.

As of March 2019, Men.com no longer features more bisexual content. After the release of the Arad Winwin scene "left many angry gay porn fans in complete shock", the MindGeek conglomerate decided to create a separate studio for bisexual porn called WhyNotBi.com.

In popular culture
In January 2015, in the wake of several controversies involving Justin Bieber and his allegedly "out-of-control" behavior, Men.com posted an Internet ad featuring its most popular actor Johnny Rapid inviting the singer to do a sex scene with him for US$2 million.

In July 2017, a line from a Men.com scene titled "Private Lessons, Part 3" (later renamed "Right in Front of My Salad") became an Internet meme. The scene depicts a woman eating dinner before noticing the cook is having sex with her husband in the kitchen, and exclaiming, "Are you guys fucking? Right in front of my salad?!". The "right in front of salad" meme is used in response to a post that is disgusting or unseemly.

Ranking 
As of January 2020, Men.com has a traffic ranking of 31,083.

See also
 List of male performers in gay porn films
 List of pornographic film studios

References

External links
 
 

MindGeek
American gay pornographic film studios
Bisexual pornography
Gay male pornography websites
American erotica and pornography websites
2003 establishments in Nevada
Companies based in the Las Vegas Valley